Benjamin Thomas Stevenson (born 19 July 1998) is an English rugby union player who plays for Newcastle Falcons in Premiership Rugby.

A former pupil of Yarm, Stevenson completed a law degree at Durham University in 2019.

References

External links
Newcastle Falcons Profile
ESPN Profile
Ultimate Rugby Profile

1997 births
Living people
English rugby union players
Alumni of Collingwood College, Durham
Durham University RFC players
People educated at Yarm School
Rugby union players from Durham, England
Rugby union wings